Donald Stanley Gardner, from Intel Corporation, Santa Clara, California, was named a Fellow of the Institute of Electrical and Electronics Engineers (IEEE) in 2012 for his contributions to integrated circuit interconnects and integrated inductor technology.

References

Fellow Members of the IEEE
Living people
Year of birth missing (living people)
Place of birth missing (living people)
American electrical engineers